A partial solar eclipse occurred on April 28, 1949.

Related eclipses

Solar eclipses 1946–1949

References

External links 

1949 in science
1949 4 28
April 1949 events